Somain is a commune in the Nord department in northern France. The former commune of Villers-Campeau was absorbed by Somain in 1947. The town was known for its extensive mining industry.

Mining
Most nearby mines were operated by either the Aniche Mining Company or the Anzin Mining Company.

The Renaissance mine was the first mine. It was opened in the south of the town in 1839. It was soon followed by the St Louis mine, which opened in 1843, and was located a few hundred yards south of the Renaissance mine. The Renaissance mine closed in 1890, and the St Louis mine in 1925.

In 1856, the Anzin Mining Company opened the Casimir Périer mine in the South East of the town, near Fenain and Abscon. Coal extraction ceased at the Casimir Périer mine in 1935, but the mine remained open to allow access to another local pit, the Saint Mark mine.

The Aniche mining company opened the De Sessavalle mine in 1902. The mine closed in 1970.

Transport
Somain was previously served by the following rail lines: Somain - Péruwelz, Aubigny-au-Bac - Somain, Somain - Halluin via Orchies, Somain - Douai (Nord), and Somain - Douai (Sud).

Population

Politics
Since 1912, the town has had the following mayors:

 1912–1945: Victor Bachelet
 1945–1947: Eugène Dutouquet
 1947–1952: Victor Bachelet
 1952–1964: Achille Fleury
 1964–1977: Marc Demilly
 1977–??: Jean-Claude Quennesson
 2020–present: Julien Quennesson (incumbent)

Education

Primary schools
There are various primary schools in Somain:
École primaire Louis-Aragon, located in De Sessevalle.
École primaire Marie-Curie, located in the town center.
École primaire Désiré-Chevalier, located in Villers-Campeau.
École primaire Henri-Barbusse, located near the Cheminots estate.
École primaire Sainte-Anne (private school).

Colleges
Somain has three colleges:
Collège Victor-Hugo, located in the town center.
Collège Louis-Pasteur, located near the Cheminots estate.
Collège Sainte-Anne, a private college located near the city center.

There are plans to renovate Collège Victor-Hugo to meet HQE standards.

Lycées
There are two lycées in Somain:
Lycée général et technologique Louis-Pasteur, located near the Cheminots estate.
Lycée Hélène-Boucher, a private college located in De Sessevalle.

See also
Communes of the Nord department

Twin towns

 Castel del Monte, Italy

Notable people
 Emmanuel Broutin (1826–1883), fencing master
 Michel Sanchez (1957–), musician

References

Communes of Nord (French department)
French Hainaut